Whitewater Preserve is a Wildlands Conservancy nature preserve consisting of  of land in Riverside County, California. It features the perennial Whitewater River flowing through a desert canyon.  The preserve is located within the San Bernardino Mountains and is part of the Sand to Snow National Monument.

Recreation
The preserve has hiking trails, picnic areas, restroom, walk-in campground, wading pool and Ranger Station Visitor Center.
Individual picnic tables are distributed around a wooded area and meadow.
A Ramada has a group picnic area.

Canyon View Loop trail crosses the river and intersects with the Pacific Crest Trail, climbs a ridge with views into the canyon and then returns to the start.  Alternatively hikers can continue further south or north on the PCT.
Heading north on the PCT destinations are Red Dome, Mission Creek Trail junction, and San Gorgonio Overlook.
Red Dome is a pockmarked rock and is one of the few shade spots along the trail.
The overlook provides a view of Whitewater Canyon and San Gorgonio Mountain.
An option is to head down Mission Creek Trail to Mission Creek Preserve Stone House campground.

Guided nature walks are offered.
Interpretive program for kids focuses on desert water cycles and watershed ecology.

The preserve has a small wading pool people can use.  Downstream from the preserve the stream passes through BLM property.  BLM closes land along the river during fire season.  People access the river despite the closure.  There are conflicts between river recreationists and local landowners.  The problem is further complicated in that the preserve has limited parking and can't accommodate everyone who wants access to water then.

The preserve closes when heavy rains are predicted due to potential flash flood.

Geography
The Visitor Center is at an altitude of 2,223 feet.
Whitewater River flows year-round from San Gorgonio Mountain down a canyon into the desert eventually reaching the Salton Sea.
The preserve is located in an ecotone where the Mojave Desert and Sonoran Desert overlap.
Despite being in a desert there is a rich riparian habitat due to the river.
The preserve is surrounded by the Bureau of Land Management's San Gorgonio Wilderness and is within the Sand to Snow National Monument.  Whitewater River is part of the National Wild and Scenic Rivers System.

The river is considered perennial yet there are a few occasions it goes dry.  Heavy storms can cause large debris flows which temporarily cover the river.  Eventually the river establishes a new flow pattern.  The water level underground can vary 10 feet depending on whether there have been heavy rains or a lengthy drought.

The Conservancy has three desert preserves in this region: Whitewater Preserve, Mission Creek Preserve, and Pioneertown Mountains Preserve.

Flora and Fauna
Large mammals include Desert bighorn sheep, deer and bear.

Over 200 species of birds have been observed.

The Southwestern Willow Flycatcher and the Least Bell's Vireo are endangered.

There are also summer tanagers and vermilion flycatchers.

Wildflowers can be excellent in the spring if there was sufficient rain the prior winter. Species include California poppies, bush poppies, and goldfields.

History
In the 1930s, Whitewater Trout Farm and hatchery was developed on private property at this location. A cattle company grazed their herd on adjacent BLM land for many decades.

In 2006, TWC acquired the property.
The Conservancy spent a decade restoring the land and creating infrastructure for visitors. They bought the 40,000 acre cattle grazing allotment in Whitewater Canyon and removed the cattle. This restored the clarity of the water. They removed 19 old buildings and built visitor facilities. They replaced non-native plants in poor condition with native plants such as cottonwoods and sycamores. The preserve was opened to the public for light recreation.

In 2016, President Obama designated Sand to Snow National Monument, which includes this preserve.

In 2019, on Valentine's Day, a major flood severely damaged the road into the canyon requiring several months to repair.

In 2020, the Water Fire burned  of riparian habitat.

References

Bibliography
 

Nature reserves in California
Protected areas of Riverside County, California